The following is a list of battles of the Mongol invasion of Kievan Rus' (1223, 1237–1241).

See also
Timeline of the Golden Horde – including all battles involving the Golden Horde in Europe
Mongol Empire
Mongol invasion of Europe
Mongol invasion of Circassia
Mongol invasions of Durdzuketia
Mongol invasion of Hungary
Mongol invasion of Kievan Rus'
Mongol invasions of Lithuania
Mongol invasion of Poland
Mongol invasion of Volga Bulgaria

References

Bibliography 
  (e-book).
 

Mongol
Kievan Rus'
Kievan Rus'
Mongol